Galium fendleri, Fendler's bedstraw, is a plant species in the Rubiaceae. It has yellow flowers and is native to Sonora, Arizona, New Mexico, and Texas.

References

External links
Vascular Plants of the Gila Wilderness, Western New Mexico University
Gardening Europe
Southwest Environmental Information Network

fendleri
Flora of Sonora
Flora of Arizona
Flora of New Mexico
Flora of Texas
Plants described in 1849